FC Bayern Munich made few squad changes for the 2008–09 season. With captain Oliver Kahn retiring and coach Ottmar Hitzfeld leaving to coach the Swiss national team, the team leaders had to be replaced. Jürgen Klinsmann was appointed as new coach as announced in December 2007. In August 2008, Klinsmann announced that Mark van Bommel would succeed Kahn as captain. Klinsmann was sacked in April 2009 when the club officials saw the club's minimum aim, qualification for the Champions League, in jeopardy after a string of games in which Bayern underperformed. Jupp Heynckes was appointed as caretaker manager.

Course of the season

Preseason 
With Ottmar Hitzfeld not available for another season, Bayern announced in December 2007 that they had signed former Bayern player and recent manager of the German national team Jürgen Klinsmann as head coach for the 2008–09 season. Oliver Kahn had, even before the 2007–08 season, announced that this would be his last season as a player. He was replaced by former reserve goalkeeper Michael Rensing, whose spot was taken by the newly signed Hans-Jörg Butt. Second reserve goalkeeper Bernd Dreher had also retired and was replaced by the amateur Thomas Kraft. Reserve strikers Jan Schlaudraff (to Hannover 96) and Sandro Wagner (to MSV Duisburg) left the club, but found no replacements. After being loaned out for two seasons, midfielder Julio dos Santos left the club for good. The only field player added to the squad was Tim Borowski, who came from Werder Bremen. All changes were made before UEFA Euro 2008. After the tournament, Bayern announced that they would make no further squad changes.

Training for the 2008–09 season began on 30 June 2008. Several players were still on vacation due to Euro 2008, while Franck Ribéry was missing due to injury. After a 45-minute in-training test against their own amateurs, the first official test was won at SV Lippstadt 7–1. Further tests on 19 July in Nördlingen and 20 July in Amberg were won 8–0 and 11–1. The T-Home Supercup against Borussia Dortmund marked the first loss of the season (1–2). After a goalless draw at 1. FC Köln on 26 July Bayern travelled to Japan for a guestplay at Urawa Red Diamonds, beating the hosts 4–2. On 5 August, Bayern hosted Internazionale in the Franz Beckenbauer Cup for the final test before the regular season, losing 1–0.

August 
On 8 August, Klinsmann announced that Mark van Bommel would succeed Oliver Kahn as captain.  Two days later, in the first cup match, third league club Rot-Weiß Erfurt provided unexpected difficulties for the Bayern as the club went to catch up on a Bayern lead three times, before having to concede to Bayern's fourth goal. In the opening game of the Bundesliga season, Bayern hosted Hamburger SV. As Hamburg caught up from two goals behind, the game finished 2–2, leaving Hamburg yet unbeaten at the Allianz Arena. After another draw at Dortmund, the succeeding week brought two squad changes for Munich, as Marcell Jansen left the club for Hamburg while Massimo Oddo was loaned out from Milan. The first league victory followed against Berlin, 4–1.

September 
Victories at 1. FC Köln in the Bundesliga and Steaua București in the Champions League were followed up with a 2–5 loss at home against rival Werder Bremen and another away at Hannover 96 (0–1) on 27 September.  Three days later, Bayern were held to 1–1 draw at home by Lyon in Champions League group play.

October 
On 4 October, Bayern drew level with VfL Bochum, despite leading 3–1 with just seven minutes left in regulation; goals in the 84th and 85th minutes, however, saw Marcel Koller's men leave the Allianz with a point. A few days later, Bayern lost a friendly at FC Ingolstadt but proceeded to win all other games in the month, including the Champions League home game against Fiorentina.

November 
After a victory at home against Arminia Bielefeld Bayern drew level in the Champions League at Fiorentina on 1 November. The following victory against Steaua București on 25 November qualified Bayern for the single elimination stage. In the Bundesliga, away matches at Schalke 04 and Borussia Mönchengladbach followed; while Bayern defeated rival Schalke, the club drew at Mönchengladbach, for the third time this season not winning against them, despite having led by two goals. The games at home against Energie Cottbus and away at Bayer Leverkusen were also won.

December / January 
On the 16th Bundesliga matchday, Bayern defeated Bundesliga leaders 1899 Hoffenheim, thus coming very close to the top of the standings. The final match of the Champions League group stage was also won at Lyon, completing Bayern's best performance in the group stage. A draw at VfB Stuttgart was Bayern's final game before the winter break. Coincidentally Stuttgart was also Bayern's first opponent after the break. While Bayern won this cup game 5–1 away, the first league match was lost at Hamburger SV, 0–1.

February 
After winning at home against Borussia Dortmund, Bayern lost their next two games at Hertha BSC, that thereby took the lead in the league, and at home against newly promoted 1. FC Köln. A 5–0 victory in the Champions League at Sporting CP was the final game of the month.

March 
After a draw in the league at Werder Bremen, Bayern was eliminated from the DFB-Pokal by Bayer Leverkusen. Munich won all other games in the month, including a 7–1 in the second leg against Sporting CP, thus achieving a record aggregate of 12–1.

April 
After 5–1 defeat in the league at VfL Wolfsburg, a direct rival for the championship, Bayern suffered another severe loss (4–0) at the hands of Barcelona. Bayern held Barcelona to a draw in the second leg a week later but was eliminated from the competition nevertheless. In the Bundesliga, Munich managed to win against underdogs Eintracht Frankfurt and Arminia Bielefeld, but a home defeat at the hands of Schalke 04 led to the dismissal of coach Jürgen Klinsmann. The club appointed Jupp Heynckes as caretaker coach and Hermann Gerland as assistant caretaker coach.

May 
Bayern won its first three games under Heynckes as coach, defeating Borussia Mönchengladbach, Energie Cottbus and Bayer Leverkusen. A draw at 1899 Hoffenheim led to a delicate situation before the last game, where second-place Bayern hosted third-place VfB Stuttgart. While the winner of the match would be qualified for the Champions League, and even win the championship if VfL Wolfsburg lost, the loser would likely fall to fourth position, outside of the Champions League spots. As fourth-place Hertha BSC lost and Wolfsburg won, the game eventually just decided that Bayern would go to the Champions League directly while Stuttgart would go to the qualification. The season concluded with four friendly games at Kaufbeuren, Eichstätt, 1. FC Magdeburg, and Fortuna Sittard, all won by Munich.

Bundesliga
Bayern hosted Hamburger SV in the opener of the 46th Bundesliga season on 15 August 2008. On the last day of play, on 23 May 2009, Bayern defeated VfB Stuttgart to finish second in the league. The second place qualified Bayern for the 2009–10 Champions League.

Matches

DFB-Pokal
In the first round of the DFB-Pokal, Bayern faced Rot-Weiß Erfurt. The east Germans from the third tier were able to equalize three times before finally succumbing to Bayern. A victory at home against second-tier 1. FC Nürnberg followed. In the third round, Bayern managed one of their best performances of the season, winning 5–1 at VfB Stuttgart, but they lost in the next round to Bayer Leverkusen.

Champions League
Bayern's Champions League season started on 17 September at Steaua București. The other group rivals were Lyon and Fiorentina. They finished the group stage undefeated in first place and eliminated Sporting CP via a record aggregate margin in the first knockout round, but then fell to Barcelona in the quarter-final. Club officials spoke of a "massive humiliation" and being "taken apart" after the 0–4 in the first leg which Bayern played without its top defender Philipp Lahm.

Group stage

Round of 16

Quarter-finals

Friendly

T-Home-Supercup

The League Cup was not held this season. Instead Bayern and Dortmund played out the unofficial T-Home-Supercup with Bayern losing 1–2.

Franz Beckenbauer Cup
Bayer invited Internazionale for the Franz Beckenbauer Cup 2009, but lost 0–1 to the guests from Italy.

Preseason

Intermediate

Winter break

Postseason

Players

Squad information

These stats are as 25 May 2009, the final day of the 2008–09 Bundesliga season.

Transfers in 

Total spending:  €0.0 million

Transfers out 

Total income:  €10,100,000

Individual statistics 

|-
|colspan="14"|Players sold/retired after the start of the season:

|}

Goals

References

External links
  FC Bayern Munich
Rough schedule of the 2008–09 Bundesliga on the DFB website
Schedule of the cup on the DFB website
 UEFA

FC Bayern Munich seasons
Bayern Munich